Fanlu Township is a rural township in Chiayi County, Taiwan.

History
After the World War II in October 1945, the township became part of Tainan County. After readjustment in October 1950, the township became part of Chiayi County. In 1951, the township governs 11 villages and 112 neighborhoods.

Administrative divisions
Jiangxi, Neiweng, Xinfu, Xiakeng, Panlu, Minhe, Chukou, Dahu, Gongtian, Gongxing and Caoshan Village.

Geography
It has a population total of 11,029 and an area of 117.5269 km2.

Tourist attractions

 Bantianyan Ziyun Temple
 Chukou Nature Center
 Dijiu Suspension Bridge
 Fonghuang Waterfall
 Jioulongshan Temple
 Longyin Temple
 Renyitan Dam
 Syongdi Waterfall
 Tongnian Resort
 Yide Temple

References

External links

 Chiayi County Fanlu Township Office

Townships in Chiayi County